Punjab Legislative Assembly election, 1997 was held in Indian state of Punjab in 1997, to elect 117 members to the Punjab Legislative Assembly. Shiromani Akali Dal had majority of the seats in the  11th Punjab Assembly that was constituted after this election. Parkash Singh Badal was elected as the Chief Minister.

Voter Statistics

Voter Turnout 
Voter Turnout and total electors list

Results

By alliance

By party 

|- align=center
!style="background-color:#E9E9E9" class="unsortable"|
!style="background-color:#E9E9E9" align=center|Political Party
!style="background-color:#E9E9E9" |No. of Candidates
!style="background-color:#E9E9E9" |Seats won
!style="background-color:#E9E9E9" |Number of Votes
!style="background-color:#E9E9E9" |% of Votes
|-
| 
|align="left"|Shiromani Akali Dal||92||75||38,73,099||37.64%
|-
| 
|align="left"|Bharatiya Janata Party||22||17||8,57,219||8.33%
|-
| 
|align="left"|Indian National Congress||105||14||27,36,346||26.38%
|-
| 
|align="left"|Communist Party of India||15||2||3,07,023||2.86%
|-
| 
|align="left"|Bahujan Samaj Party||67||1||7,69,675||6.37%
|-
| 
|align="left"|Shiromani Akali Dal (M)||30||1||3,19,111||3.10%
|-
| 
|align="left"|Independents||244||6||11,18,348||10.87%
|-
|
|align="left"|Total||693||117|| 1,02,89,814||
|-
|}

Results by constituencies

Government formation
Shiromani Akali Dal had majority of the seats in the  11th Punjab Assembly that was constituted after this election. Parkash Singh Badal was elected as the Chief Minister.

Bye Elections 1997-2002

See also 
2002 Punjab Legislative Assembly election

1992 Punjab Legislative Assembly election

References
3. https://www.indiavotes.com/ac/info?eid=133&stateac=7

1997 State Assembly elections in India
1997
1997